A List of Czech films of the 1970s.

1970s
Czech
Films